Peter Birch (31 August 1952 – 13 September 2017) was a British actor born in Harrogate into a military family which travelled worldwide. He was educated at the Duke of York's Royal Military School, Bristol University and Bristol Old Vic Theatre School.
His notable roles included appearances as Herr Ulrich in the comedy drama series Auf Wiedersehen, Pet, consultant Jack Hathaway in the drama series Casualty (1996–1997) and Arthur Eliott in The House of Eliott.

He also appeared in TV's By The Sword Divided, Portrait of a Marriage, Dennis Potter's Blackeyes, Poirot and the film Aria in the section directed by Bruce Beresford. Stage credits included Bristol Old Vic, Chichester Festival and Pitlochry Festival theatres, Simon Gray's Quartermaine's Terms in London's West End, Young Vic, Shakespeare at St George's, Sheridan's The Rivals and on tour for the British Council. He broadcast for the BBC - poetry and in radio plays.
 
From the late 1990s, his career moved into theatre-based communication applied to change management & conflict resolution in which he took his PhD (Manchester University) and undertook assignments through Manchester Business School and Cranfield School of Management. He published in relevant professional journals.
 
He married Cristina Cano from Cordoba, Spain, with a son Henry (b. 2012). He died on 13 September 2017 in the Royal Marsden Hospital, Chelsea, London, of esophageal cancer.

References

External links

English male television actors
Actors from Harrogate
Male actors from Yorkshire
1952 births
2017 deaths